Greg James (born 1985) is a British DJ and broadcaster.

Greg James may also refer to:
Greg James (radio show), the radio show hosted by the DJ
Greg James (judge) (born 1944), Australian judge
Greg James (tattoo artist), American tattoo artist

See also